Jabez or Jabes is a character in the biblical Books of Chronicles.  Jabez may also refer to:

Mononym
 Eric Nicol (1919–2011), Canadian author, wrote under the pen-name "Jabez"

Given name

People
Jabez Balfour (1843–1916), British businessman, Liberal Party politician and fraudster
Jabez A. Bostwick (1830–1892), American businessman who was a founding partner of Standard Oil
Jabez Bowen, Jr. (1739–1815), deputy governor of Rhode Island, militia colonel during the American Revolutionary War and Chief Justice of the Rhode Island Supreme Court
Jabez Bryce (1935–2010), Anglican Archbishop of Polynesia and the first Pacific Islander to become an Anglican bishop
Jabez Bunting (1779–1858), English Methodist
Jabez Burns (1805–1876), English nonconformist divine and Christian philosophical writer
Jabez Coon (1869–1935), member of the Australian House of Representatives
Jabez Lamar Monroe Curry (1825–1903), lawyer, soldier, U.S. Congressman, college professor and administrator, diplomat, and Confederate officer
Jabez Darnell (1884–1950), English footballer
Jabez Hamlin (1709–1791), Connecticut politician and judge
Jabez Delano Hammond (1778–1855), American physician, lawyer, author and politician
Jabez Carter Hornblower (1744–1814), English pioneer of steam power
Jabez Huntington (1719-1786), Major General in the Connecticut state forces, Connecticut Council of Safety member, merchant from Norwich, Connecticut
Jabez W. Huntington (1788–1847), U.S. Representative and Senator from Connecticut
Jabez Young Jackson (1790–1839), U.S. Representative from Georgia
Jabez Leftwich (1765–1855), Representative from Virginia
Jabez Bunting Snowball (1837–1907), Canadian politician and businessman, Lieutenant Governor of New Brunswick
J. Curry Street (1906–1989), American physicist, co-discover of muons
Jabez G. Sutherland (1825–1902), Representative from Michigan and judge
Jabez Upham (1764–1811), Representative from Massachusetts
Jabez Vodrey (1795–1861), first English potter west of the Appalachian Mountains of North America
Jabez Waterhouse (1821–1891), English-born Australian Methodist minister
Jabez H. Wells (1853–1930), American politician and curler

Fictional characters
Jabez Clegg, the eponymous character in Isabella Banks' 1876 novel The Manchester Man and its 1920 film adaptation
Jabez Dexter, the villain of the 1949 Wonder Woman comic Sensation Comics #87
Jabez North, the villain of Mary Elizabeth Braddon's first novel The Trail of the Serpent
Jabez Potter, in Alice B. Emerson's Ruth Fielding of the Red Mill (1913), the first of a 30-book series 
Jabez Stone, the protagonist of the short story "The Devil and Daniel Webster" and its film adaptations
Jabez Stump, a secondary character in the 1989 Redwall series novel Mattimeo and the second season of the Redwall animated television show, which is also called Mattimeo
Jabez Wilson, a main character in the Sherlock Holmes short story "The Red-Headed League"
Jabez, a boat rental operator on the Thames in Connie Willis's To Say Nothing of the Dog

Surname
Barzillai ben Baruch Jabez, Turkish Talmudist of the seventeenth and eighteenth centuries
Joseph ben Hayyim Jabez (15th century-16th century), Spanish-Jewish theologian

References 

de:Jabez
he:יעבץ